The Ratman of Southend is an English urban legend originating in Southend-on-Sea, Essex.
The story of the Ratman tells of an old homeless man, seeking shelter from the cold in an underpass, was set upon by a group of youths and beaten to near-death, cold and blood loss doing the rest. As he died, the numerous vermin who inhabit the area gathered, and were found to have devoured his face. After this, a ghostly figure was spotted in the underpass, with people hearing ratlike squealing, and scraping, as if large claws were moving across the walls.

In popular culture
A short film about the Ratman of Southend, directed by Michael Holiday, was entered in 2019 during the annual Horror-on-Sea film festival in Southend.

In 2020, Afterlight Comics published Folktales of the Cryptids Vol. 2. An anthology revolving around different folkloric creatures, in which the Ratman is included.

References

External links
from Mysterious Britain
Article discussing the Ratman story among other folkloric English characters
A list of Southend's most haunted locations
BBC America article

Urban legends
English ghosts
Southend-on-Sea (town)